Shanghai Children's Medical Center is a station on Line 6 of the Shanghai Metro. It began operation on December 29, 2007.

This station was the southern terminus for short-turn services, the new short-turn terminus is Gaoqing Road station.

Places nearby 
Renji Hospital (East Part)
Shanghai Children's Medical Center

References 

Railway stations in Shanghai
Shanghai Metro stations in Pudong
Railway stations in China opened in 2007
Line 6, Shanghai Metro